Mon Louis Island, originally known as Isle aux Maraguans, is an island on the coast of the U.S. state of Alabama, south of Mobile. Mon Louis is traversed by Alabama State Route 193, which travels in a north to south direction along the eastern edge of the island. The Gordon Persons Bridge on the southern end of Route 193 connects the island to Dauphin Island. The unincorporated communities of Alabama Port, Heron Bay, and Mon Louis are located on the island.

History
Mon Louis Island was first settled in the early 18th century by  French Louisiana colonists.  A land grant was made to Nicholas Baudin, Sieur de Miragouane, on November 12, 1710.  Baudin was from [Rochefort, France having come to Mobile in 1706 at the age of 20 years..  He established a settlement on the northern end of the island known as Miragouane. The island eventually came to be called Mon Louis, in honor of his son Louis Alexandre Baudin known as mon Louis (my Louis).  By the 19th century, the island was populated by people originally from various countries of origin and Creoles, along with a mix of ethnic groups.

References

Islands of Alabama
Landforms of Mobile County, Alabama
Mobile Bay